Commonwealth Place is located on the southern shore of Lake Burley Griffin, Canberra. It lies along the ‘water axis’ running along the lake from Black Mountain. Commonwealth Place is the location of the Gallery of Australian Design, Reconciliation Place, a restaurant and Speakers Square. Walter Burley Griffin, the architect who designed Canberra, envisaged that the area would be the site of a "water gate" which would have a terrace above it, providing a "forum for the people". Griffin's vision was for a long time left unrecognised but as of 2005 the area was being developed to reflect the original plan.

Speakers Square, at the centre of Commonwealth Place is a concave shaped grassed area with a paved mural in the middle which was a gift to Australia from the Government of Canada to mark the Centenary of Australian Federation. A display of international flags lines the lake shore, one flag for each nation with a diplomatic mission in the capital. Flags include those of the United Nations, European Union and the Holy See.

References 

Parks in Canberra
Canberra urban places
National squares